Jasna Majstorović (born April 23, 1984) is a volleyball player from Serbia, playing as a spiker/winger. She was a member of the Women's National Team that won the silver medal at the 2007 European Championship in Belgium and Luxembourg. She plays for Romanian club CSM București.

Awards

Clubs
 2011 FIVB Club World Championship -  Champion, with Rabita Baku

References
CEV Profile

world of volley

1984 births
Living people
Sportspeople from Čačak
Serbian women's volleyball players
Expatriate volleyball players in Azerbaijan
Universiade medalists in volleyball
Serbian expatriate sportspeople in Switzerland
Serbian expatriate sportspeople in Turkey
Serbian expatriate sportspeople in Romania
Serbian expatriate sportspeople in Azerbaijan
Serbian expatriate sportspeople in France
Expatriate volleyball players in Romania
Universiade silver medalists for Serbia
Medalists at the 2009 Summer Universiade
Expatriate volleyball players in France
Expatriate volleyball players in Turkey
Expatriate volleyball players in Switzerland